The office of Mayor of Penzance was established under the Penzance Charter of incorporation of 1614 granted by James I. This charter allowed for the appointment of 12 assistants and eight aldermen to govern the town one of whom who would be chosen as Mayor at the start of each civic year. Under the charter the Mayor of Penzance was the Chief Executive of the town as well as its chief magistrate.  In 1832 this arrangement was abolished under the Municipal Corporations Act 1835 the role of Mayor at this time was largely reduced to 'first citizen' and Chairman of the Town Council the executive functions being passed to the Town clerk.  In 1974 following the abolition of Penzance Borough Council under the Local Government Act 1972 the position of Mayor become a purely ceremonial one, the Mayor being chosen from Penzance members of the newly created Penwith District Council, this was further altered in 1980 when the Penzance Town Council was created.  The Penzance current civic year and Mayoral term of office is from May to May the following year.

This list is taken from Peter A. S. Pool's History of the Borough of Penzance and from information held by Penzance Town Council.

Mayors of the Original Borough of Penzance 1614–1836

Mayors of the reformed borough of Penzance 1836–1932

Mayors of the enlarged Borough 1932–1974 
(Penzance borough from this period includes, Heamoor, Gulval, Newlyn, and Mousehole.)

Charter Trustee Mayors 1974–1980 and Penzance Town Mayors 1981 onwards

Penzance Town Mayors

References

Mayors
Penzance
Penzance
 Penzance